Eois gemellaria is a moth in the  family Geometridae. It is found in French Guiana and Brazil.

References

Moths described in 1858
Eois
Moths of South America